Catocala eutychea is a moth of the family Erebidae first described by Georg Friedrich Treitschke in 1835. It is found in the eastern parts of the Mediterranean, especially the Balkans.

There is one generation per year. Adults are on wing from June to August.

The larvae feed on Quercus coccifera.

References

External links

Image

eutychea
Moths described in 1835
Moths of Europe